Hernia repair refers to a surgical operation for the correction of a hernia—a bulging of internal organs or tissues through the wall that contains it. It can be of two different types: herniorrhaphy; or hernioplasty. This operation may be performed to correct hernias of the abdomen, groin, diaphragm, brain, or at the site of a previous operation. Hernia repair is often performed as an ambulatory procedure.

Techniques

Inguinal hernia repair

The first differentiating factor in hernia repair is whether the surgery is done open, or laparoscopically. Open hernia repair is when an incision is made in the skin directly over the hernia. Laparoscopic hernia repair is when minimally invasive cameras and equipment are used and the hernia is repaired with only small incisions adjacent to the hernia. These techniques are similar to the techniques used in laparoscopic gallbladder surgery.

An operation in which the hernia sac is removed without any repair of the inguinal canal is described as a herniotomy. When herniotomy is combined with a reinforced repair of the posterior inguinal canal wall with autogenous (patient's own tissue) or heterogeneous material such as prolene mesh, it is termed hernioplasty as opposed to herniorrhaphy, in which no autogenous or heterogeneous material is used for reinforcement.

Stoppa procedure
The Stoppa procedure is a tension-free type of hernia repair. It is performed by wrapping the lower part of the parietal peritoneum with prosthetic mesh and placing it at a preperitoneal level over Fruchaud's myopectineal orifice. It was first described in 1975 by Rene Stoppa. This operation is also known as "giant prosthetic reinforcement of the visceral sac" (GPRVS).

This technique has met particular success in the repair of bilateral hernias, large scrotal hernias, and recurrent or rerecurrent hernias in which conventional repair is difficult and which carries a high morbidity and failure rate. The most recent reported recurrence rate (involving 230 patients with 420 hernias and a maximum of 8 years follow-up) was 0.71%. The totally extra-peritoneal repair (TEP) uses exactly the same principles as the Stoppa repair, except that it is performed laparoscopically.

References

External links
 European Hernia Society guidelines on the treatment of inguinal hernia in adult patients.
 American Hernia Society
 Surgery Methods, Inguinal Hernia, Description, Comparison

Hernias
Surgical procedures and techniques
Digestive system surgery